Who Wants To Be Me? is a 2000 book by Regis Philbin. It is a response to the success of the game show Who Wants to Be a Millionaire? and deals with more antics about the show and Philbin's life.

References

2000 non-fiction books
American autobiographies
Who Wants to Be a Millionaire?